St Peter's church (Spanish: Iglesia de San Pedro) is a Romanesque-style, Roman Catholic church located in Caracena, Spain. The 12th-century church is most notable for the carvings on the capitals on the columns of the atrium, and in pedestals on the cornice.

Conservation 

It has been designated a Bien de Interés Cultural, and has been protected by a heritage listing since 1935.

References 

Bien de Interés Cultural landmarks in the Province of Soria
Churches in Castile and León
Caracena
12th-century Roman Catholic church buildings in Spain